Literary Club may refer to:

Literary Club of Cincinnati
Literary Club (magazine), a Bulgarian literary e-magazine
Literary Club, an alternate name for The Club (dining club)

See also
Book club (disambiguation)